Dryden v Greater Glasgow Health Board [1992] IRLR 469 is a UK labour law case concerning the contract of employment. It held that a variation of company workplace customs, which are incorporated into individual contracts of employment can take place after a proper consultation without breaching employees' contracts.

Facts
Ms Dryden was a nursing auxiliary in a Glasgow hospital. She smoked around 30 cigarettes a day. After consultations, which she did not contribute to, smoking was banned. She claimed constructive dismissal on the basis that the workplace custom being unilaterally changed breached her employment contract.

Judgment
Lord Coulsfield in the Edinburgh Employment Appeal Tribunal held that a unilateral variation on the workplace rules did not amount to a breach of any contract term. The consultation process was influential in making the rule change legitimate. He said the following.

See also

UK labour law
Employment contract in English law
Autoclenz Ltd v Belcher [2011] UKSC 41

Notes

References

United Kingdom labour case law
Employment Appeal Tribunal cases
1992 in case law
1992 in British law
1992 in Scotland
Scottish case law
United Kingdom employment contract case law
Tobacco case law
Tobacco in the United Kingdom